In 2010, the Hull Kingston Rovers competed in the 15th season of the Super League and also in the Challenge Cup.

2010 transfers
Ins

Outs

2010 squad

Coaching team

Fixtures and results

External links
 Official website
 East Hull is Wonderful fanzine
 Unofficial Hull KR fans internet forum
 Hull KR Junior Robins

Hull Kingston Rovers seasons
Hull Kingston Rovers season

fr:Hull Kingston Rovers